Takeo Mizoo (born 11 March 1937) is a Japanese speed skater. He competed in four events at the 1960 Winter Olympics.

References

1937 births
Living people
Japanese male speed skaters
Olympic speed skaters of Japan
Speed skaters at the 1960 Winter Olympics
Sportspeople from Hokkaido